The Andalusia Technology Park in Málaga is a science park.

The Parque Tecnológico de Andalucía was conceived as a technological nucleus to stimulate industry in Andalusia. This complex is one of the most important economic centres in the south of Spain, with over 600 companies and 16,774 employees in 2015.

The sectors with the greatest presence at the PTA are: Information Technology (Electronics, Information, Computing and Telecommunications) together with Engineering, Consultancy and Advisory services.  Most of the companies are focused on information technology, telecommunications, and research and development. They include some multinationals such as Oracle, Ericsson, IBM,  TDK, Ciklum, CGI,  Accenture and Huawei.

PTA is one of the most important technological parks in southern Europe and since 1995, the world headquarters of the International Association of Science Parks (IASP).

References

External links 

 Parque Tecnológico de Andalucía 
 Malaga, the place for global companies 
 Malaga Open for Business 
 Digital Malaga, virtual space of the Malaga Innovation Ecosystem 
 IASP, International Association of Science Parks
 Foro PTA

Buildings and structures in Málaga
Science parks in Spain